Moyobamba  is an airport serving the town of Moyobamba in the San Martín Region of Peru. The runway is just northwest of the town.

See also

Transport in Peru
List of airports in Peru

References

External links
OpenStreetMap - Moyobamba
OurAirports - Moyobamba

Airports in Peru
Buildings and structures in San Martín Region